Nanni d'Antonio di Banco ( 1384 – 1421) was an Italian Renaissance sculptor from Florence.

Early life 
He was born to artist Antonio di Banco, who worked on the Cathedral of Florence in Florence, Italy.  Historians have tried to determine the year of his birth between 1375 and 1390 based on colleagues. Nanni di Banco seemed to have had a close relationship with well known artist Donatello. With this knowledge Nanni’s life timeline circles Donatello’s. 
In February of 1405 Nanni was enrolled as an artist into the masons’ guild Arte di Pietra e Legname. This guild allowed him to work in the cathedral directly where he began his work as a sculptor. Nanni and his father were commissioned to carve the Isaiah statue for the Cathedral.

Career 
Antonio was strictly a stone-carver resulting in the sculpture done by Nanni alone. Nanni was the Magister of his and his father’s workshop where Donatello was recruited from to build the sculpture David. Nanni was selected to carve a sculpture of St. Luke which took him 5 years to complete. He is mostly known for his work in transitioning from gothic to renaissance art.

Colleagues 
A contemporary of Donatello and Lorenzo Ghiberti, Nanni was a sculptor in fifteenth-century Florence. He is well known for his sculpture group Four Crowned Martyrs (Quattro Santi Coronati) (1412–15) which was commissioned by the stone carvers and wood workers guild for the Church of Orsanmichele. The significance of this work is not only the striking naturalism and individuality of the figures, but also the complexity of construction of a sculpture group.

His Works 
Nanni di Banco made a name for himself in the transition from International Gothic art to Renaissance art creating a path for Early Renaissance in Florence. Many of his works are displayed inside the Cathedral, the church and museum of Orsanmichele in Florence. His first major work was a statue of the Isaiah in 1408 for the Cathedral his father worked for.

The Quattro Coronati was created in 1416. At this time many artists wanted to depict pagan gods and saints but were hung. Nanni di Banco decided to depict a dialogue between four saints, creating the title. The sculpture not only shows dialogue but also demonstrates the extent to which human behavior can be portrayed by stone.  It is easy to find ancient Roman influence on the four sculptures. Many of the faces and togas look similar to ancient Roman republican sculptures. Artists were required to develop a sculpture for the outside of church St. Michele. Nanni’s colleague, Donatello, is credited to sculpt one saint. However, Nanni di Banco portrays a dialogue in which only one of the four men is speaking and the rest are listening, not directly looking at the subject but still engaging in conversation.

San Luca is a marble sculpture, in works with the renaissance artist Donatello. Nanni di Banco exploits the themes of humanism and a new proposal to human expression. Furthermore, we can understand how the influence of this movement was to express the outline and the human face through shadowing and posture.

Giorgio Vasari includes a biography of Nanni di Banco in his Lives of the Most Excellent Painters, Sculptors, and Architects.

Main works
 Main relief of the Assumption, Porta di Mandorla, Florence Cathedral (1414–21)
 St. Luke (1408-1415), Florence Cathedral
 Quattro Santi Coronati (Four Saints) (1408–15) - Orsanmichele, Florence

References

External links
 National Gallery of Art
 
 

1384 births
1421 deaths
Sculptors from Florence
15th-century Italian sculptors
Italian male sculptors